Materialist feminism highlights capitalism and patriarchy as a central aspect in understanding women's oppression. It focuses on the material, or physical, aspects that define oppression. Under materialist feminism, gender is seen as a social construct, and society forces gender roles, such as rearing children, onto women. Materialist feminism's ideal vision is a society in which women are treated socially and economically the same as men. The theory centers on social change rather than seeking transformation within the capitalist system.

Jennifer Wicke defines materialist feminism as "a feminism that insists on examining the material conditions under which social arrangements, including those of gender hierarchy, develop... materialist feminism avoids seeing this gender hierarchy as the effect of a singular... patriarchy and instead gauges the web of social and psychic relations that make up a material, historical moment". She states that "...materialist feminism argues that material conditions of all sorts play a vital role in the social production of gender and assays the different ways in which women collaborate and participate in these productions". Material feminism also considers how women and men of various races and ethnicities are kept in their lower economic status due to an imbalance of power that privileges those who already have privilege, thereby protecting the status quo. Materialist feminists ask whether people have access to free education, if they can pursue careers, have access or opportunity to become wealthy, and if not, what economic or social constraints are preventing them from doing so, and how this can be changed.

History 
The term materialist feminism emerged in the late 1970s and is associated with key thinkers, such as Rosemary Hennessy, Stevi Jackson and Christine Delphy.

Rosemary Hennessy traces the history of materialist feminism in the work of British and French feminists who preferred the term materialist feminism to Marxist feminism. In their view, Marxism had to be altered to be able to explain the sexual division of labor. Marxism was inadequate to the task because of its class bias and focus on production. Feminism was also problematic due to its essentialist and idealist concept of woman. Material feminism then emerged as a positive substitute to both Marxism and feminism and pointed out the unequal distribution of social resources.

Material feminism partly originated from the work of French feminists, particularly Christine Delphy. At the time of the coining of the term, Delphy was actually criticized by other feminists. Since Materialist feminism was so close to Marxism, but did not actually submit to Marxist text; many other's saw this branch as unnecessary due to not being Marxist enough. However, after the 1980s, most modern feminism began to branch away from focusing on physical oppression and instead started to focus more on the language of oppression. Delphy believed that there were two modes of production in our society: industrial and domestic. The first mode allows for capitalist exploitation while the second allows for familial and patriarchal exploitation. She argued that materialism is the only theory of history that views oppression as a basic reality of women's lives. Delphy states that this is why women and all oppressed groups need materialism to investigate their situation. For Delphy, "to start from oppression defines a materialist approach, oppression is a materialist concept". She states that the domestic mode of production was the site of patriarchal exploitation and the material basis of the oppression of women. Delphy further argued that marriage is a labor contract that gives men the right to exploit women.

The Grand Domestic Revolution by Dolores Hayden is a reference. Hayden describes material feminism at that time as reconceptualizing the relationship between the private household space and public space by presenting collective options to take the "burden" off women in regard to housework, cooking, and other traditional female domestic jobs.

Relationship to Marxist feminism 
Marxist feminism is focused on investigating and explaining the ways in which women are oppressed through systems of capitalism and private property. As stated previously, materialist feminism was developed as an improvement upon Marxism, as it was felt that Marxist feminism failed to address division of labor, especially in the household. The current concept has its roots in socialist and Marxist feminism; Rosemary Hennessy and Chrys Ingraham, who are editors of Materialist Feminism: A Reader in Class, Difference, and Women's Lives, describe material feminism as the "conjuncture of several discourses—historical materialism, Marxist and radical feminism, as well as postmodernist and psychoanalytic theories of meaning and subjectivity".

Intersectional approaches 
Materialist feminism has been criticized for assuming universal oppression of women. By focusing on capitalist relations combined with patriarchy, materialist feminism fails to include women of different classes, sexualities, and ethnicities. Hazel Carby challenged the materialist feminist analyses of the family as universally oppressive to all women. She instead noted the ways that values of the family are different for black women and men, just as the division of labor is also racialized.

In recent years, materialist feminist thoughts have attempted to focus on transnational issues. Scholars consider a global economic change in relation to the feminization of poverty. Feminist scholars are also working to create a transnational feminist agenda. For example, Rosemary Hennessy analyzes grassroots organizations in four maquiladora communities along Mexico's northern border. The research claims that the global nature of patriarchy and capitalism sustains a "political economy of sex".

Criticisms 
The relationship between materialism and feminism has been described as "problematic" and regarded as an "unhappy couple". There has also been a concern for the general ambiguity of materialist feminism. It has been called to question whether the differentiation between materialist feminism and Marxist feminism is great enough to be a worthwhile contribution to feminist theory. However, the main criticism for materialist feminism involves the lack of intersectionality within the theory. While Material Feminism has always focused on the idea that gender is a social construction, Rosemary Hennessy comments on how there has recently been pressure to recognize the differences within the definition of "woman" and how this intersects with not only class, but race, sexualities, and genders.

Christine Delphy's contributions to materialist feminism have also been the subject of criticism, for example by Michèle Barrett and Mary McIntosh. They suggest that the definition of materialism feminism has a very loose interpretation of patriarchy and that Delphy's article "Towards a Materialist Feminism" has a focus limited to the oppression of wives and fails to connect this to the global oppression of women in general.

Stevi Jackson also calls concern towards the recent resurgence of materialist interest, stating that many of the new ideas were reducing the material to capitalist ideas, and that "this might bring us full circle back to the least productive forms of 1970s Marxism".

Relation to modern feminism 
There was a cultural turn during the 1990s that moved to push the boundaries of what the category of "woman" was. As feminism became post-feminism, the notion of femininity was "problematized, rather than taken as a given" as told by Stevi Jackson. As feminists stopped seeing women as a social hierarchy and instead a sexual division, the concept of materialist feminism began to fade further and further away. Similarly, as discourse turned to the specifics of what defined a woman, the roles and physical oppressions they faced became of less importance. This was partly due to the notion that feminism had achieved what it set out to do. That women got the equality, and now it was time to focus on intersectionality.

See also 
 Christine Delphy
 Double burden
 Economic materialism
 Feminist economics
 Feminist urbanism
 Monique Wittig
 Rosemary Hennessy
 Stevi Jackson
 Social construction of gender
 Sally Haslanger

References 

Feminism and social class
Feminism and the family
Marxist feminism
Materialism
Radical feminism
Second-wave feminism